Benimarfull is a municipality in the comarca of Comtat in the Valencian Community, Spain, just 14.5 kilometers (9 miles) from the town of Alcoy.

Benimarfull is one of 14 municipalities in the Association of Municipalities of Alcoy, which supports the area through economic, cultural and educational initiatives.

Satellite Image
 Benimarfull: . Source: WikiMapia

References

Municipalities in the Province of Alicante
Comtat